In Manichaeism, Siddartha Gautama is considered one of the four prophets of the faith, along with Zoroaster, Jesus and Mani. Mani believed that the teachings of Gautama Buddha, Zoroaster, and Jesus were incomplete, and that his revelations were for the entire world, calling his teachings the "Religion of Light".

Manichaeism also often calls Jesus a Buddha This is because the term prophet was unfamiliar to a Chinese audience so Buddha was used as a substitute. It does not imply a belief in enlightenment. See #Usage of the term Buddha to refer to other individuals

Manichaeism was introduced into China during the Tang dynasty through Central Asian communities and was regarded as an improper form of Buddhism by the Tang authorities.

Influences from Buddhism 

Manichaeism was directly influenced by Buddhism. Like Buddha, Mani aimed for nirvana and used this word, showing the significance of Buddhist influences. He further believed in the transmigration of souls, sangha, and used various Buddhist terms in his teachings. Mircea Eliade noted similarities in the symbolism of light and mystic knowledge, predating Manichaeism, and possibly going back to an early common Indo-Iranian source. Mani considered himself to be a reincarnation of Buddha. He also claimed that he was preaching the same message of Buddha. Giovanni Verardi notes that Manichaeism is the prime source for comparisons between Buddhism and Gnosticism, Manichaeism representing "the same urban and mercantile ambience of which Buddhism was an expression in India." When the mercantile economy declined due to the decline of the Roman Empire, Manichaeism lost its support. The Manichaeans were hostile to the closed society of farming and landownership, just like the Buddhism conflicted with the "non-urban world controlled by Brahman laymen."

Mani, an Arsacid Persian by birth, was born 216 AD in Mesopotamia (modern Iraq), then within the Persian Sassanid Empire. According to the Cologne Mani-Codex, Mani's parents were members of the Jewish Christian Gnostic sect known as the Elcesaites.

Mani believed that the teachings of Buddha, Zoroaster, and Jesus were incomplete, and that his revelations were for the entire world, calling his teachings the "Religion of Light." Following Mani's travels to the Kushan Empire at the beginning of his proselytizing career, various Buddhist influences seem to have permeated Manichaeism:

According to Willis Barnstone and Marvin Meyer, evidence of the influence of Buddhist thought on the teachings of Mani can be found throughout texts related to Mani. In the story of the death of Mani, the Buddhist term nirvana is used:

Usage of the term to refer to other individuals 

After Manichaeism was introduced into China, because the image of Jesus was quite unfamiliar to Chinese culture, missionaries combined it with Buddhist culture, called Jesus Buddha, and gave him a model of great mercy and relief. Buddhist image. Therefore, believers wrote in the following excerpt from the hymn "Praise Jesus Text", which is like a Buddhist scripture in the Chinese Manichaean hymn scroll:

The Manichaean Painting of the Buddha Jesus is titled referring to Jesus as a Buddha.

In the Uighur confession, four prayers are directed to the supreme God (Äzrua), the God of the Sun and the Moon, and fivefold God and the buddhas.

Late syncretism and decline 

Following the introduction of Manichaeism to China, Manichaeans in China adopted a syncretic, sinified vocabulary borrowed primarily from Chinese Buddhism. Between 9th and 14th-centuries, following centuries of pressure to assimilate and persecution by successive Chinese dynasties, Chinese Manichaeans increasing involved themselves with the Pure Land school of Mahayana Buddhism in southern China, practicing together so closely alongside the Mahayana Buddhists that over the years Manichaeism came to be absorbed into the Pure Land school making the two traditions indistinguishable. Through this close interaction, Manichaeism had profound influence on Chinese Maitreyan Buddhist sects such as the White Lotus Sect.

Manichaeism survived among the population and had a profound influence on the tradition of the Chinese folk religious sects integrating with the Maitreyan beliefs such as the White Lotus Sect.

Due to the rise of the Ming dynasty the name for Manichaeism Mingjiao was seen as offensive to the Emperor, so it received particular persecution

An account in Fozu Tongji, an important historiography of Buddhism in China compiled by Buddhist scholars during 1258–1269, says that the Manichaeans worshipped the "white Buddha" and their leader wore a violet headgear, while the followers wore white costumes. Many Manichaeans took part in rebellions against the Song government and were eventually quelled. After that, all governments were suppressive against Manichaeism and its followers and the religion was banned by the Ming Dynasty in 1370.

During and after the 14th century, some Chinese Manichaeans involved themselves with the Pure Land school of Mahayana Buddhism in southern China. Those Manichaeans practiced their rituals so closely alongside the Mahayana Buddhists that over the years the two sects became indistinguishable. 

Manichaeism in China assumes certain Chinese characteristics, assimilating to both Buddhism and Taoism. Chinese translations of Manichaean treatises are couched in Buddhist phraseology, and the religion's founder (Mar) Mani (known in China as 摩尼,  (Mo)-Mani) received the title of the  "Buddha of Light" ( or ), and a life story resembling that of Gautama Buddha. At the same time, the supposedly Taoist treatise, the Huahujing "Scripture of the Conversion of the Barbarians", popular with Chinese Manichaeans, declared Mani to be a reincarnation of Laozi.  As to the Confucian civil authorities of the Song state, when the clandestine cells of Mani's followers came to their attention, they were usually lumped together with assorted other suspicious and potentially troublesome sects as "vegetarian demon worshipers".

Not surprisingly, such Manichaean temples that were erected in Song China usually had an official Buddhist or Taoist affiliation. There are records, for example, of a Manichaean temple in Taoist disguise at Siming. This temple - one of the northernmost known Manichaean sites of the Song era - was established in the 960s, and was still active - in a more standard Taoist way, but with a memory of Manichaeism retained - in the 1260s.

In Qianku there is also a strong veneration of the Sun and the Moon, which are often called the Sunlight Buddha and Moonlight Buddha by locals

Cao'an temple 

The Cao'an temple in Fujian stands as a vivid example the subsumption of Manichaeism into Buddhism, as a statue of the "Buddha of Light" is thought to be a representation of the prophet Mani.

The most remarkable Manichaean relic in the temple is the statue of Manichaeism's founder Mani, commonly referred to in the Chinese Manichaean tradition as the "Buddha of Light". According to an inscription, the statue was donated to the temple by a local adherent in 1339.

While the statue may look like any other Buddha to a casual observer, experts note a number of peculiarities which distinguish it from a typical portrayal of the Buddha. Instead of being curly-haired and clean-shaven, as most other Buddha statues, this Buddha of Light is depicted having straight hair draped over his shoulders, and sporting a beard. The facial features of the prophet (arched eyebrows, fleshy jowls) are somewhat different from a traditional Chinese stone Buddha as well. It is even said that the stone Mani the Buddha of Light used to have a mustache or sideburns, but they were removed by a 20th-century Buddhist monk, trying to make the statue more like a traditional Buddha.

Instead of looking down, as Buddha statues usually do, the Mani statue looks straight at the worshipers. Instead of being held in a typical Buddhist mudrā, Mani's hands rest on his belly, with both palms facing upward.

In order to give the statue an overall luminous impression, the sculptor carved its head, body, and hands  from stones of different hues.

Instead of a nianfo phrase, universally seen in China's Buddhist temples, an inscription on a stone in the courtyard dated 1445 urges the faithful to remember "Purity (清净), Light (光明), Power (大力), and Wisdom (智慧)", which are the four attributes of the Father of Light, one of the chief figures of the Manichaean pantheon. These four words (eight Chinese characters) were apparently an important motto of Chinese Manichaeism; it is described as such in an anti-Manichean work by the Fujianese Taoist Bo Yuchan (real name Ge Changgeng; fl. 1215). The original inscription was destroyed during the Cultural Revolution, but later "restored" (apparently, on another rock).

See Also 

 Chinese Manichaeism
 Jesus in Manichaeism

Annotations

Notes

References

References 

 

Manichaeism
Gautama Buddha